The Supreme Council (Soviet) of the Republic of Belarus of the 12th convocation is the Belarusian parliament, which was elected in 1990 as the Supreme Council of the Belarusian Soviet Socialist Republic of the 12th convocation. It became a national parliament of Belarus after the proclamation of independence. The Supreme Council adopted the Declaration of Independence of Belarus on July 27, 1990. It is widely regarded as the final democratically-elected Parliament of Belarus.

The first round of voting to the Supreme Council was held on March 4, 1990. Following the elections, 360 deputies were elected to the parliament. For the first time the opposition took place in Parliament. As a result, the Belarusian Popular Front opposition faction with 26 deputies was formed. The total number of deputies was 328 people.

The successor of the Supreme Soviet of the 12th convocation was the newly elected Supreme Council of the Republic of Belarus of the 13th convocation, which began its work January 9, 1996.

Bibliography
Палітычная гісторыя незалежнай Беларусі / Пад рэд. Валера Булгакава. Вільня, Інстытут Беларусістыкі. — 2006. — 744 с.

References

 
Historical legislatures